Venustatrochus is a genus of sea snails, marine gastropod mollusks in the family Calliostomatidae.

Species
Species within the genus Venustatrochus include:
 Venustatrochus atlantis B. A. Marshall, 2016
 Venustatrochus eclectus B. A. Marshall, 2016
 Venustatrochus galateae  B. A. Marshall, 2016
 Venustatrochus georgianus A. W. B. Powell, 1951
 Venustatrochus malaita Vilvens, 2009
 Venustatrochus secundus Powell, 1958
 Venustatrochus youngi B. A. Marshall, 2016

References

 Marshall, B. A. (2016). New species of Venustatrochus Powell, 1951 from New Zealand, and new species of Falsimargarita Powell, 1951 and a new genus of the Calliostomatidae from the southwest Pacific, with comments on some other calliostomatid genera (Mollusca: Gastropoda). Molluscan Research. 36: 119-141

External links
 Powell, A. W. B. (1951). Antarctic and Subantarctic Mollusca: Pelecypoda and Gastropoda. Discovery Reports. 26: 47-196, pl. 5-10

 
Calliostomatidae